Catherine Arthelia Kidwell (January 14, 1921 – February 17, 2002) was an American novelist who began her career in writing late in her life, and was best known for her semi-autobiographical novel Dear Stranger.

Born in Lowry City, Missouri, Kidwell enrolled at the University of Nebraska-Lincoln in 1969, together with her daughter Jane.  She culminated her studies with a Master of Fine Arts degree in 1977 at the age of 56.  Her thesis, The Woman I Am, was published as a Dell paperback.  Kidwell then developed the story further and turned it into the novel Dear Stranger, which Warner Books published in February 1983 and was chosen as a Literary Guild selection.

She continued to write and to teach writing at Southeast Community College in Lincoln; she died at the age of 81, after a struggle with Parkinson's disease.

Bibliography
 The Woman I Am (1979)
 Dear Stranger (1982)
 "I Couldn't Put It Down": How to Write Quality Fiction in Ten Easy Lessons (1986)

References

 "Catherine (Arthelia) Kidwell", Contemporary Authors Online, Thomson Gale, entry updated 15 June 2001.
 Dear Stranger at Kirkus Reviews

American women novelists
1921 births
2002 deaths
University of Nebraska–Lincoln alumni
People from Lowry City, Missouri
Writers from Lincoln, Nebraska
Novelists from Missouri
20th-century American novelists
20th-century American women writers